Draco caerulhians  is a species of lizard. It is endemic to Sulawesi, Indonesia.

References 

biaro
Endemic fauna of Indonesia
Reptiles of Indonesia
Reptiles described in 1992